1408 is a 2007 American psychological horror film based on Stephen King's 1999 short story of the same name. It stars John Cusack and Samuel L. Jackson, was directed by Mikael Håfström and released in the United States on June 22, 2007.

The film follows Mike Enslin, an author who investigates allegedly haunted locales. Enslin receives an ominous warning not to enter the titular room 1408 at a fictional New York City hotel, The Dolphin. Although skeptical of the paranormal, he is soon trapped in the room where he experiences bizarre and frightful events.

Reviews were mostly positive and 1408 was a box-office success, garnering nearly 5 times its production budget of $25 million.

Plot
Mike Enslin is a cynical and skeptical author of niche books debunking supernatural events, in which he has no belief. While promoting his latest book, he receives an anonymous postcard depicting The Dolphin, a hotel on Lexington Avenue in New York City, bearing the message: "Don't enter 1408." Viewing this as a challenge, Mike travels to The Dolphin and requests room 1408. The hotel manager, Gerald Olin, attempts to discourage him. He explains to Mike that in the last 95 years, no one has lasted more than an hour inside of 1408; the latest count is 56 deaths. Olin attempts to dissuade and even bribe Mike, but at Mike's insistence and threat of legal action against the hotel, preparations are reluctantly made.

While Mike describes the room's boring appearance and absence of supernatural behavior on his mini-cassette recorder, the clock radio suddenly starts playing The Carpenters' "We've Only Just Begun", and the digital display changes to a countdown starting from 60:00. Mike begins to see ghosts of the room's past victims, along with flashbacks of his deceased daughter Katie and his terminally ill father. Mike makes numerous attempts to leave the room, all in vain. As the temperature in the room starts to rapidly increase, Mike uses his laptop to contact his estranged wife Lily and ask for help. The heat activates the sprinkler system, short circuiting the laptop, which starts to work again when the temperature drops to subzero. A doppelgänger of Mike appears in a video chat window, urging Lily to come to the hotel room herself and giving Mike a sly wink.

The room starts to shake violently, causing Mike to crash into a picture of a ship in a storm, from which water floods the room. He finds himself reliving a surfing accident from before he entered the room. Recovering in hospital, he reconciles with Lily and assumes his experience in 1408 was just a nightmare; Lily encourages him to write a book about it. When visiting the post office to send the manuscript to his publisher, he recognizes members of a construction crew as Dolphin Hotel staff, who start destroying the walls, revealing that Mike is still trapped inside 1408. Katie's ghost confronts him, and when the countdown ends, the room restores itself and the clock radio resets to 60:00.

A female voice calling herself "hotel operator" calls Mike. Mike asks why he has not been killed yet and she informs him that guests enjoy free will: he can relive the past hour over and over again, or use their "express checkout system". A hangman's noose appears, but he refuses to give in. Mike improvises a Molotov cocktail and sets the room on fire. He then lies down and laughs in victory upon destroying the room. The hotel is evacuated and Olin, in his office, praises Mike for his actions.

Endings
There are four endings to this film. In addition to the ending that appears in the theatrical release (also the default ending of the DVD), three other alternative endings were shot. The incentive for this was based on the director's belief that King's intention, in his original short story, was to leave the conclusion ambiguous. None of the four endings matches the ending of King's original short story.

Theatrical
This is the default ending of the theatrical release and its theatrical release DVD. It is also used on the Amazon Prime, Netflix UK, and the YouTube Movies version of the film.

Mike survives and reconciles with Lily, though Lily is skeptical of his experience. She finds a box of Mike's possessions that were rescued from 1408 and Mike takes the damaged mini-cassette recorder from it, saying: "Sometimes you can't get rid of bad memories. You've just got to live with them." Mike briefly tampers with the recorder, making it work again. Suddenly, they hear Katie's voice coming from it, confirming Mike's account.

An alternative version of this ending has the same events but Lily does not acknowledge hearing Katie's voice on the tape and only Mike's reaction is shown.

Director's cut
Director Mikael Håfström said the ending of 1408 was reshot because test audiences felt the original was a "downer".

The original discarded ending had Mike dying in the fire, but happy to see the room destroyed. He spitefully laughs as the room screams in agony, and everything burns and crashes on top of him. At Mike's funeral, Olin approaches Lily and Mike's publisher Sam Farrell. He unsuccessfully attempts to give her a box of Mike's possessions, including the tape recorder. Olin claims that the room was successfully destroyed and that it will no longer hurt anyone else. He later listens to the recording in his car and becomes upset when he hears Katie's voice on the tape. He sees a little girl in a dress walking on the cemetery grass behind the car, calling out as if she is lost. He then sees Mike's burnt corpse in the backseat. Then he sees the same girl holding hands with her father as they walk away. Olin places the tape recorder back in the box and drives off. The final scene is of the gutted room, where an apparition of Mike assesses the death of the entity while smoking a cigarette. He hears his daughter calling for him and disappears as he walks toward the door. A door is heard closing and the scene fades.

This ending is the default ending on the Blu-ray release and two-disc collector's edition. Canadian networks Space and The Movie Network, and U.S. network FX broadcast this version of the film. Space broadcast the theatrical ending on July 23, 2012. This ending is also used on the U.K. and Australian DVDs, and the U.S. iTunes and Netflix versions of the film.

Other
Mike dies in the fire. Instead of the funeral scene from the director's cut, the sounds of a funeral are dubbed over shots of Los Angeles. Lily and Sam sort through Mike's effects. Sam returns to his New York office and discovers the manuscript that Mike wrote while he was in room 1408. As Sam reads the story, audio from Mike's experiences in the room is heard. In a final scene, Sam's office doors slam shut and Mike's father's voice says: "As you are, I was. As I am, you will be."

Cast
 John Cusack as Michael "Mike" Enslin
 Samuel L. Jackson as Gerald Olin
 Mary McCormack as Lily Enslin
 Tony Shalhoub as Sam Farrell
 Len Cariou as Mike's father
 Jasmine Jessica Anthony as Katie Enslin
 Isiah Whitlock Jr. as Hotel Engineer
 Kim Thomson as Hotel Desk Clerk
 Benny Urquidez as Claw Hammer Maniac
 Angel Oquendo as Taxi Cab Driver
 Andrew-Lee Potts as Mailbox Guy
 Jules de Jongh as the Female Front-Desk Voice on the Phone (Uncredited)

Production
In November 2003 and 2004, Dimension Films optioned the rights to the 1999 short story "1408" by Stephen King. The studio hired screenwriter Matt Greenberg to adapt the story into a screenplay. In October 2005, Mikael Håfström was hired to direct 1408, with the screenplay being rewritten by screenwriters Scott Alexander and Larry Karaszewski. In March 2006, actor John Cusack was cast to star in the film, joined by actor Samuel L. Jackson the following April. In July, actress Kate Walsh was cast to star opposite Cusack as the protagonist's ex-wife, but she was forced to exit in August due to scheduling conflicts with her role on Grey's Anatomy. She was replaced by actress Mary McCormack. According to Cusack, the Roosevelt Hotel in New York was used for some of the exterior shots of the Dolphin. The lobby scenes were filmed at the Reform Club in London.

Reception
On the review aggregator Rotten Tomatoes, the film has an approval rating of 79% based on 175 reviews, with an average rating of 6.70/10. The site's critical consensus reads: "Relying on psychological tension rather than overt violence and gore, 1408 is a genuinely creepy thriller with a strong lead performance by John Cusack." On Metacritic, the film had an average score of 64 out of 100, based on 27 reviews, indicating "generally favorable reviews". Audiences polled by CinemaScore gave the film an average grade of "B−" on an A+ to F scale.

James Berardinelli awarded the film three stars out of four, calling it "the best horror film of the year". He offered significant praise for Cusack's performance as Mike Enslin, writing: "This is John Cusack's movie to carry, and he has no problem taking it where it needs to go." He found the film "reminds us what it's like to be scared in a theater rather than overwhelmed by buckets of blood and gore". Some critics called the film far superior to other adaptations of Stephen King novels and stories. Mick LaSalle of the San Francisco Chronicle described it as "one of the good Stephen King adaptations, one that maintains its author's sly sense of humor and satiric view of human nature" and "more genuinely scary movie than most horror films".

Several critics found the film underwhelming. Wesley Morris of The Boston Globe wrote a mixed review, describing the film as "a lot of consonants and no vowels". He compared it unfavorably to The Shining, a similar King adaptation, believing 1408 lacked that film's "lunging horror and dramatic architecture". He wrote that it "conjures a wonderful anticipatory mood of dread in the first 30 minutes, then blows it to stylish smithereens". Rob Salem of the Toronto Star gave the film two stars out of four for seeming a predictable "hit and miss" production. Like Morris, Salem wrote: "Even as haunted hotel King movies go, 1408 is certainly no Shining. Not even the TV-movie version."

Box office
In its opening weekend, the film opened in second place at the box office, grossing US$20.6 million in 2,678 theaters. 1408 had a production budget of US$25 million. The film went on to gross US$132 million, of which US$71.9 million was from Canada and the United States.

Home media
The DVD was released on October 2, 2007, by Genius Products with a standard 1-Disc Edition (widescreen or fullscreen), and a 2-Disc Collector's Edition that contains both versions of the ending and an unrated edition which restored six minutes of the film.

See also
 Cell
 List of adaptations of works by Stephen King
 List of ghost films

References

External links

 
 
 
 
 

2007 horror films
2000s English-language films
2000s ghost films
2000s horror thriller films
2000s psychological horror films
American ghost films
American horror thriller films
American psychological horror films
American supernatural horror films
Di Bonaventura Pictures films
Dimension Films films
Films about child death
Films about writers
Films based on American short stories
Films based on works by Stephen King
Films directed by Mikael Håfström
Films produced by Lorenzo di Bonaventura
Films scored by Gabriel Yared
Films set in hotels
Films set in Manhattan
Films shot at Elstree Film Studios
Films shot at Pinewood Studios
Films shot in London
Films shot in Los Angeles
Films shot in New York City
Films with screenplays by Scott Alexander and Larry Karaszewski
Haunted hotels
Metro-Goldwyn-Mayer films
The Weinstein Company films
2000s American films